The Women's singles event at the 2022 Mediterranean Games will be held from 27 June to 30 June at the Habib Khelil Tennis Complex.

Jéssica Bouzas Maneiro and Guiomar Maristany of Spain won the gold medal, defeating Francesca Curmi and Elaine Genovese of Malta in the final, 6–3, 6–2.

Nuria Brancaccio and Aurora Zantedeschi of Italy won the bronze medal, defeating Chiraz Bechri and Feryel Ben Hassen of Tunisia in the bronze medal match, Walkover.

Medalists

Seeds
  (semifinals; bronze medalists)
  (champions; gold medalists)
  (Quarterfinals)
  (final; silver medalists)

Draw

References

External links
 Women's Doubles Draw

Women's doubles
2022 in women's tennis